The Iarnród Éireann 8500, 8510 and 8520 Classes are three related types of EMU used on the DART network in Dublin, Ireland. The total fleet numbers a total of 17 four-car trains, all of which were constructed by the Tokyu Car Corporation.

8500 Class

The 8500 Class were delivered in 2000 and were the first four car units to be used on the DART network. They are numbered in the sequence 860X+850X+850Y+860Y. 850X/850Y units are power cars while 860X/860Y units are unpowered driving trailers. Their interior destination displays and public announcement system has been long turned off. Like all DART units, the 8500 Class are maintained at Fairview depot, and are also stabled at Bray Station.

8510 Class

The 8510 Class were delivered in 2001 as three 4-car trains supplementing the original 8500 Class. Vehicles are numbered in the sequence 861X+851X+851Y+861Y. 851X/851Y units are power cars while 861X/861Y units are unpowered driving trailers. The most visible difference between the 8510 Class and the 8500 Class is the now obsolete passenger information system which is installed in the 8510s. Other differences include the presence of destination/next station displays above the windows of 8510s and the use of LED tail lights and headlights on 8510s in contrast with ordinary ones on the 8500s. They are capable of operating in multiple with the 8500 and 8520 Classes. The units are maintained at Fairview depot.

8520 Class

The 8520 Class was introduced in 2004; there are ten of these sets. The units can be seen working in multiple with an 8500 or 8510 though usually with another 8520 unit. Vehicles are numbered in the sequence 86XX+85XX+85YY+86YY. 85XX/85YY units are power cars while 862X/862Y units are unpowered driving trailers. They were the first units to carry the revised DART logo and also the first to be fully air conditioned. They can be distinguished from the previous 8500s and 8510s by the profile of the bodyshell, which is more rectangular, by the lack of opening windows in the passenger seating area and that the 8520s have flatter seats than the 8500s and 8510s. During 2022, the entire fleet was refurbished. This refurbishment included new exterior LED destination displays on the front and side, new interior displays showing information such as the destination, next stop and time & a new PA system.

Fleet details

Gallery

See also

Multiple Units of Ireland
Dublin Area Rapid Transit
IE 8200 Class

References

External links
 Irish Rail Fleet Information webpage 
 Japan Transport Engineering Company webpage

 
1500 V DC multiple units
Tokyu Car multiple units